Microtis quadrata, commonly known as the south coast mignonette orchid or south coast onion orchid, is a species of orchid endemic to south-west coastal areas of Western Australia. It has a single thin, hollow, onion-like leaf and up to one hundred small, pale green flowers. This onion orchid grows on low mounds in swamps, often with other species of mignonette orchids, and flowers much more prolifically after fire.

Description
Flowering occurs from December to January, much more prolifically after fire the previous summer.

Taxonomy and naming
The south coast mignonette orchid was first formally described in 1990 by Robert Bates from a specimen collected in a swamp near Nornalup. Bates gave it the name Microtis media subsp. quadrata and published the description in Journal of the Adelaide Botanic Gardens. In 2004, David Jones and Mark Clements changed the name to Microtis quadrata. The specific epithet (quadrata) is a Latin word meaning "four-cornered", referring to the shape of the labellum.

Distribution and habitat
Microtis quadrata grows in seasonally wet depressions and in swampy mounds in near-coastal areas between Perth and Augusta. It is often found with other species of Microtis orchids.

Conservation
Microtis quadrata is classified as "Priority Four" by the Government of Western Australia Department of Parks and Wildlife, meaning that is rare or near threatened.

References

External links
 

quadrata
Endemic orchids of Australia
Orchids of Western Australia
Plants described in 1990